Blinded by the Lights (Polish: Ślepnąc od świateł) is a Polish crime television series consisting of 8 episodes, which launched on HBO Europe on 27 October 2018. On 1 May 2019, it premiered in the United States.

It is based on Jakub Żulczyk's 2014 novel of the same name.

Synopsis
The series spans seven days in the life of Kuba Nitecki, a well-known but mysterious Warsaw cocaine dealer whose clientele includes politicians, celebrities, businesspeople, hip-hop artists, and hipsters. Nitecki is among a group of local gangsters led by Władek "Stryj", who are in turn part of a bigger gang, led by Jacek. Tired of his life so far, Nitecki decides to escape to Argentina.

Cast and characters
 Kamil Nożyński as Kuba Nitecki
 Jan Frycz as Dario
 Robert Więckiewicz as Jacek
 Marta Malikowska as Maria "Pazina" Pazińska 
 Janusz Chabior as Władek "Stryj"
 Marzena Pokrzywińska as Paulina
 Cezary Pazura as Mariusz Fajkowski

References

External links
 
 Ślepnąc od świateł on Filmweb 
 Ślepnąc od świateł on FilmPolski.pl 

2010s Polish television series
2018 Polish television series debuts
2018 Polish television series endings
Polish crime television series
HBO Europe original programming
Polish-language HBO original programming
Television shows based on Polish novels